The Black Hill in South Lanarkshire is owned by the National Trust for Scotland. It overlooks the Clyde Valley, and is the location of a burial cairn from the Bronze Age and an Iron Age fortress.

The hill is 2 miles (3 km) east of Blackwood and looks down to the Clyde valley at Kirkfieldbank. It peaks at a height of 290m (or 951 feet) - and now has an ordnance survey triangulation point on top of the cairn. Views include Goat Fell on the island of Arran and the Cobbler, Ben Lomond and parts of the Southern Highlands.

As a strategic viewpoint it has been valued for over 4,000 years. Today, the outline of the Iron Age fort and its settlement enclosure along with the Bronze Age burial cairn are clearly visible. The site may have had spiritual significance for these early peoples, indeed it has been suggested that the cairn was built in line with the larger summit cairn on Tinto, and may have been used as a means of deciding the date of the Winter solstice.

It was designated a Scheduled Ancient Monument in 1969.

References

External links
Feature in the Hamilton Advertiser April 11, 2008

National Trust for Scotland properties
Iron Age sites in Scotland
Scheduled Ancient Monuments in South Lanarkshire
Hill forts in Scotland
Former populated places in Scotland
Archaeological sites in South Lanarkshire